Tony Hawk: Shred is a 2010 peripheral-based, motion-controlled skateboarding video game. It is part of the Tony Hawk series and the sequel to Tony Hawk: Ride.

Shred introduces a snowboarding mode to the series as well as Avatar and Mii support on the Xbox 360 and Wii versions respectively. A "surfing" mode was worked on for the game, but was soon scrapped due to funds and short amount of time to work on it.

Reception and hiatus
The initial price for the game was $120 for a bundle including the skateboard controller and approximately $50 for the stand-alone game. During its first week on sale in the United States, the game sold 3,000 copies; combined with the mixed to negative reception, the Tony Hawk franchise was put on hold.

References

External links

2010 video games
Activision games
Multiplayer and single-player video games
Multiple-sport video games
PlayStation 3 games
Skateboarding video games
Snowboarding video games
Shred
Video game sequels
Video game spin-offs
Wii games
Xbox 360 games
Video games developed in the United States
Robomodo games